The Blakeley River is a distributary river in Baldwin County, Alabama that forms part of the Mobile-Tensaw River Delta.

See also
List of Alabama rivers

References

Rivers of Baldwin County, Alabama
Rivers of Alabama
Tributaries of Mobile Bay